Louis Emile Marie Madelin (8 May 1871 – 18 August 1956) was a French historian (specialising in the French Revolution and First French Empire) and a Republican Federation deputy for Vosges from 1924 to 1928. He is buried at the  Cimetière de Grenelle.

Biography
Madelin was born in Neufchâteau (Vosges).  Studying history at the École des chartes, he became a member of the École française de Rome then a professor at the faculté des lettres de Paris. He married in 1898, having four children by his first wife and on her death remarrying in 1909 to Marthe Clavery. During the First World War he was conscripted in 1914, becoming a sous-lieutenant and information officer before being demobbed in 1918 and receiving the Croix de guerre.

Elected to the Académie française in 1927 (replacing Robert de Flers in seat 5), in Lorraine he became president of the Association des Amis du berceau de Jeanne d'Arc on the death of Lyautey - the Association organised mass demonstrations in Domrémy from 1937 to 1939 under the aegis of the Compagnons de Jeanne d'Arc. In 1948 he participated in the creation of the Comité pour la Libération du Maréchal Pétain.

Works

 1901  De conventu Bononiensis  
 1901  Fouché  
 1905  Croquis lorrains   
 1906  La Rome de Napoléon  
 1906  Le général Lasalle  
 1911  La Révolution   
 1913  La France et Rome   
 1914  Danton   
 1916  La victoire de la Marne   
 1916  L'aveu, la bataille de Verdun et l'opinion allemande
 
 1917  La mêlée des Flandres, l'Yser et Ypres   
 1918  L'expansion française de la Syrie au Rhin   
 1919  Les heures merveilleuses d'Alsace et de Lorraine   
 1920  Verdun. La bataille de France.  
 1921  Le chemin de la victoire, 2 vol   
 1922  La France du Directoire   
 1925  La colline de Chaillot   
 1925  Le maréchal Foch  
 1926  La France de l'Empire   
 1928  Les hommes de la Révolution   

 1929  Le Consulat de Bonaparte   
 1931  La Fronde   
 1932  Le Consulat et l'Empire, 2 vol   
 1933  Les grandes étapes de l'Histoire de France   
 1935  Lettres inédites de Napoléon à l'impératrice Marie-Louise, écrites de 1810 à 1814. Napoléon. La Contre-Révolution sous la Révolution   
 1936  Le crépuscule de la monarchie   
 1937  François Ier, le souverain politique   
 1937-1953  Histoire du Consulat et de l'Empire, 16 vol.  
 1944  Talleyrand   
 1945  Édition des Mémoires de Fouché.

References

External links
 

1871 births
1956 deaths
People from Neufchâteau, Vosges
Politicians from Grand Est
Republican Federation politicians
Members of the 13th Chamber of Deputies of the French Third Republic
Members of the Académie Française
Historians of the French Revolution
French military historians
20th-century French historians
French biographers
French male non-fiction writers
French military personnel of World War I
Recipients of the Croix de Guerre 1914–1918 (France)